Salhouse railway station is on the Bittern Line in Norfolk, England, serving the village of Salhouse.

It is managed by Greater Anglia, which also operates all passenger trains that call.

Services

At peak times, service frequency is increased to one train per hour.

External links
 Salhouse station on navigable 1946 O.S. map

Railway stations in Norfolk
DfT Category F2 stations
Former Great Eastern Railway stations
Railway stations in Great Britain opened in 1874
Greater Anglia franchise railway stations